Two Stories Up or Across the Yard and Two Flights Up (Swedish: Två trappor över gården) is a 1950 Swedish drama film directed by Gösta Werner and starring Gertrud Fridh, Bengt Eklund and Irma Christenson. It was shot at the Råsunda Studios in Stockholm and on location around the city. The film's sets were designed by the art director Nils Svenwall.

Synopsis
The artist Bengt Hallberg escapes from a mental asylum and heads out to find Inga Larsson, the only person in the world he cares about.

Cast
 Gertrud Fridh as 	Inga Larsson
 Bengt Eklund as 	Bengt Hallberg
 Irma Christenson as 	Tessan
 Sif Ruud as Gunhild
 Elof Ahrle as	Konrad
 Åke Fridell as 	Caretaker
 Björn Berglund as 	Inga's Father
 Ilse-Nore Tromm as 	Inga's Mother
 Stig Järrel as Art collector
 Lisskulla Jobs as 	Deaconess
 Harriet Andersson as 	Girl in social shelter
 Wiktor Andersson as 	Johan
 Britta Billsten as Bojan
 Ann Bornholm as 	Young Inga
 Åke Claesson as 	Chief Physician
 Julia Cæsar as 	Julia
 Carl Deurell as	Angry old man in basement
 Sven-Eric Gamble as 	Gunnar
 Göthe Grefbo as 	Salvation Army Lieutenant
 Nils Hallberg as 	Knarren
 Magnus Kesster as 	Police Interrogator
 Sven Lindberg as Doctor
 Arne Lindblad as Peddler
 Ingrid Lothigius as 'Ugglan'
 Gunnar Sjöberg as 	Reverend
 Tom Walter as Tjocken

References

Bibliography 
  Cowie, Peter Françoise Buquet, Risto Pitkänen & Godfried Talboom. Scandinavian Cinema: A Survey of the Films and Film-makers of Denmark, Finland, Iceland, Norway, and Sweden. Tantivy Press, 1992.
 Larsson, Mariah & Marklund, Anders. Swedish Film: An Introduction and Reader. Nordic Academic Press, 2010.

External links 
 

1950 films
Swedish drama films
1950 drama films
1950s Swedish-language films
Films directed by Gösta Werner
1950s Swedish films